Domani è troppo tardi (internationally released as Tomorrow Is Too Late) is a 1950 Italian melodrama film directed by Léonide Moguy.

For this film Pier Angeli won the Silver Ribbon for best actress. The film was also awarded Best Italian Film at the Venice Film Festival.

Cast
 Pier Angeli: Mirella (as Anna Maria Pierangeli)
 Vittorio De Sica: Professor Landi
 Lois Maxwell: Signorina Anna, insegnante
 Gino Leurini: Franco
 Gabrielle Dorziat: preside
 Armando Migliari: preside
 Lauro Gazzolo: Signor Giusti
 Carlo Romano: Signor Barrardi
 Olga Solbelli: Signora Giusti
 Ave Ninchi: Signora Berardi
 Monique van Vooren: Giannina 
 Carlo Delle Piane: Enzo
 Luciano De Ambrosis
 Lina Marengo: Serafina

References

External links

1950 films
Italian drama films
1950s Italian-language films
Films directed by Léonide Moguy
1950 drama films
Films scored by Alessandro Cicognini
Italian black-and-white films
Melodrama films
1950s Italian films